The Taoyuan Metro (formerly Taoyuan Rail Transit and officially Taoyuan Mass Rapid Transit System) is a rapid transit system serving Taoyuan City, as well as parts of New Taipei City and Taipei City, in Taiwan. The most recently proposed network includes 11 lines and extensions, of which 2 are now under construction. The Taoyuan Airport MRT (Taipei Main Station - Huanbei) is the only line currently in operation. The system opened with the opening of the first line in the system, Taoyuan Airport MRT, for trial passenger service on 2 February 2017 and revenue passenger service on 2 March 2017.

History 
 2 March 2017: The Airport line, officially the Taoyuan Airport MRT opened for service.

Network and operations

Lines

Infrastructure

Taoyuan Airport Line

Trains 
Airport trains come in two types, commuter and express train. Commuter trains stop at every station.

Free Wi-Fi 
Free Wi-Fi is available throughout the system.

Future expansion 
All lines will use standard gauge track, with the exception of the Red line which will use  track as it is basically a reconstruction of the Taoyuan portion of the TRA Western Line into an underground railway tunnel intended to support more frequent, rapid transit-like local rail services (rather like the reconstruction of TRA railways in Greater Taipei and Kaohsiung). The Taolin Line segment of the Brown Line from Taoyuan to Shanbi is intended to be built as a bus rapid transit route.

Construction 

In March 2011, the Bureau of High Speed Rail, which oversees construction of the project, announced that the -long elevated structure from Dayuan Station (A15) to Xingnan Station (A20) had been completed. The rest of the Taoyuan Line passed an environmental impact assessment in July 2014. Construction was expected to last from June 2015 to 2019. Construction of the Green Line started in October 2018 and is expected to finish in 2026. Construction of the Brown Line is expected to start in 2023, and expected to be completed by 2026.

Network Map

See also 
 Rail transport in Taiwan
 Transportation in Taiwan

Notes

References

External links 

 
 Department of Rapid Transit Systems,Taoyuan, Taoyuan

2017 establishments in Taiwan
Buildings and structures in Taoyuan City
Transportation in Taoyuan City